Christian the Elder, Duke of Brunswick-Lüneburg, (1566–1633) was Prince of Lüneburg and Administrator of the Prince-Bishopric of Minden.

Life 
Christian was born on 9 November 1566, the second son of Duke William of Brunswick-Lüneburg and Dorothea of Denmark, was elected in 1597 as Coadjutor of the Prince-Bishopric of Minden and took office as the bishop himself in 1599. After the death of his elder brother, Ernest II (1611), he took over the rule of the Principality of Lüneburg and acquired the Principality of Grubenhagen in 1617, which was merged. 

When the Thirty Years' War broke out he joined, with Duke Frederick of Holstein, the side of the Emperor, became colonel of the Lower Saxon Circle troops (Kreistruppen) and sought with great skill to keep the scene of the war as far from the bishopric territory as possible; despite that in 1623 the imperial forces under General Tilly occupied the land. When Lower Saxon noblemen then prepared to defend themselves, Christian resigned his post of circle colonel. Not until 1629, when the Edict of Restitution was passed, did he join the Protestant faith.

He died on 8 November 1633.

Ancestors

References

Sources 
 
  C.V. Wedgwood, The Thirty Years War

External links

House of Welf

Princes of Lüneburg
1566 births
1633 deaths
Lutheran Prince-Bishops of Minden
Middle House of Lüneburg
New House of Lüneburg